Nas Air may refer to:

flynas, formerly Nas Air, Saudi Arabia
Nasair, Nasair Eritrea